The Athletics Tournament at the 1999 Summer Universiade took place in the new Estadio Son Moix in Palma de Mallorca, Spain from July 4 to July 9, 1999. Five Universiade records were set. A total of 23 men's and 22 women's events were contested (the programme remaining identical to the previous edition with steeplechase being for men only).

The United States topped the athletics medal table (as it did in 1997) with a total of 25 medals, twelve of them gold. Romania and Cuba were the next strongest nations, with six and five gold medals respectively. Romania was the only other nation to reach double figures in the medal tally. The host nation, Spain, won six medals. A total of 38 nations reached the medal table.

Among the returning 1997 champions, Cuban Yoelbi Quesada won the men's triple jump for a second time, while three women managed that feat: Olena Shekhovtsova (long jump), Olena Hovorova (triple jump) and Mihaela Melinte (hammer throw). Melinte also went on to win the global title at the 1999 World Championships in Athletics held the following month.

Medal summary

Men

Women

Medal table

Participating nations

See also
1999 in the sport of athletics

References
 Medalists on HickokSports
 Finals results by FISU
 Day 1 results (archived)
 Day 2 results (archived)
 Day 3 results (archived)
 Day 4 results (archived)
 Day 5 results (archived)

 
Athletics at the Summer Universiade
Uni
1999 Summer Universiade
International athletics competitions hosted by Spain